The Russian Women's Futsal Championship is the women's premier futsal championship in Russia, is operated by the AMFR. It was founded in 1993, which is played under UEFA rules and currently consists of 6 teams.

Because of the 2022 Russian invasion of Ukraine, FIFA and Union of European Football Associations (UEFA) suspended from FIFA and UEFA competitions all Russian teams, whether national representative teams or club teams.

Champions by year

References

External links
Official Website
Futsalplanet

Futsal competitions in Russia
Russia
1993 establishments in Russia
Sports leagues established in 1993
Women's sports leagues in Russia
National championships in Russia
Professional sports leagues in Russia